HMS Sharpshooter was an  destroyer which served with the Royal Navy during World War I. Launched on 27 February 1917, the ship joined the Harwich Force, undertaking convoy escort duties. The vessel also took part in the Navy’s bombardment of Ostend later that year. On 1 June 1918, the destroyer rescued  Captain A. C. Sharwood, one of the first pilots of the Royal Australian Navy, who ditched his Sopwith 2F.1 Camel nearby. After the war, Sharpshooter joined the Navy gunnery training establishment at Plymouth, but did not stay long and was reduced to Reduced Complement on 5 March 1919. The Royal Navy was rationalising its destroyer force and Sharpshooter, deemed superfluous, was sold to be broken up on 29 April 1927.

Design and development

Sharpshooter was one of ten  destroyers ordered by the British Admiralty in December 1915 as part of the Seventh War Construction Programme. The design was based on the preceding  and differed primarily in utilising geared steam turbines to improve fuel consumption.

Displacement was approximately  normal. Three funnels were fitted.

Armament consisted of three QF 4in Mk IV guns on the ship's centreline, with one on the forecastle, one aft on a raised platform and one between the second and third funnels. A single 2-pounder (40 mm) pom-pom anti-aircraft gun was carried, while torpedo armament consisted of two twin mounts for  torpedoes. The ship had a complement of 82 officers and ratings.

Construction and career
Sharpshooter was laid down at the William Beardmore and Company shipyard in Dalmuir during May 1916 with the yard number 550 at a contract price of £170,722. The vessel was launched in December 1916 and completed in February 1917.

On commissioning, Sharpshooter joined the 10th Destroyer Flotilla of the Harwich Force. The destroyer was engaged in escort duties and, on 9 April, was accompanying a convoy travelling east from the Netherlands when it was attacked by the German submarine . The submarine successfully sank one of the merchant ships, but before it could unleash another torpedo, Sharpshooter saw the track made by the wake and, following it, rushed upon the submarine, dropping three depth charges and scaring it away.

At 2:30 in the morning of 5 June, the destroyer was part of a flotilla of four cruisers and nine destroyers that were patrolling off Thornton Bank when they spotted the German destroyers S15 and S20. A vigorous battle ensued, during which a torpedo narrowly missed Sharpshooter, passing astern. The flotilla subsequently undertook anti-submarine patrols, but the destroyer did not sight an enemy boat.

Sharpshooter remained part of the 10th Destroyer Flotilla at the end of the war. After the conflict, the ship was transferred to the Gunnery School at Portsmouth and, on 5 March 1919, was reduced to Reduced Complement. In 1923, the Navy decided to scrap many of the older destroyers in preparation for the introduction of newer and larger vessels. Sharpshooter was sold for scrap to Thos. W. Ward at Briton Ferry on 29 April 1927.

Pennant numbers

References

Citations

Bibliography
 
 
 
 
 
 
 
 
 
 
 
 

1917 ships
Ships built on the River Clyde
R-class destroyers (1916)
World War I destroyers of the United Kingdom